USS Lapwing (MSC(O)-48/AMS-48/YMS-268) was a  built for the United States Navy during World War II. She was named after the lapwing (Vanellus vanellus).

History
YMS-268 was laid down 1 December 1942 by Kruse & Banks Shipbuilding Co., North Bend, Oregon; launched 15 April 1943; sponsored by Mrs. J. H. Granger; and commissioned 31 July 1943.
 
After shakedown along the west coast, YMS-268 trained minesweeper crews out of San Pedro, California, throughout the most of the war, contributing to the war effort by increasing the efficiency of American minesweeping operations throughout the world.
 
Following 2 years of training operations, the minesweeper arrived Pearl Harbor 26 May 1945 for deployment to the western Pacific. Assigned to the U.S. 7th Fleet, YMS-268 operated out of Guam, the Philippines, and Okinawa from July to August. Following the surrender of Japan, she removed mines from Tokyo Bay and around the Island of Honshū.
 
Departing Kobe 9 March 1946, the veteran ship reached San Francisco, California 24 April. After 1 month on the west coast, YMS-268 steamed to the Great Lakes via the St. Lawrence River. Upon arriving at Chicago on 25 July, she was assigned to the 9th Naval District Reserve Training program. YMS-268 decommissioned and was placed in service 1 November 1946.
 
Reclassified AMS-48 and named Lapwing 1 September 1947, she continued operations in the Reserve Training program. Lapwing recommissioned 12 February 1951 at Orange, Texas. Arriving Charleston, South Carolina,  19 March, the minesweeper engaged in operations along the U.S. East Coast, developing new techniques in mine warfare until 1957. During this period she was reclassified MSC(O)-48 on 7 February 1955.

Lapwing decommissioned 15 November 1957 at New York City and entered the Atlantic Reserve Fleet. She was struck from the Naval Vessel Register 1 November 1959.

The veteran minesweeper was sold to Standard Products Co., Inc. of Kilmarnock, Virginia, who converted her to a menhaden fishing boat and renamed her Weems. In 1987 she was sold to Yale Iverson, a retired lawyer from Des Moines, Ia. who renamed her Endeavor and converted her into a research/cargo vessel. The ship sunk in the summer of 1990 off the coast of the Dominican Republic.

Awards and honors 
YMS-268 received one battle star for World War II service.

References

External links 
 
 uboat.net - Allied Warships - Minesweeper USS YMS-268 of the YMS class 
 DANFS Online: Mine Warfare Vessels

YMS-1-class minesweepers of the United States Navy
Ships built in North Bend, Oregon
1943 ships
World War II minesweepers of the United States
Training ships of the United States Navy
Cold War minesweepers of the United States
North Bend, Oregon